Yan Nawa or Yannawa is one of the 50 districts (khet) of Bangkok, Thailand. The district is bounded by (clockwise from west to northeast) Rat Burana (across Chao Phraya River), Bang Kho Laem, Sathon, and Khlong Toei Districts of Bangkok. Its neighbor from east to south is Phra Pradaeng district of Samut Prakan province.

History
Yan Nawa, in the past, was called Ban Thawai (Tavoy village) or Ban Khok Khwai (water buffalo pen village) due to a large concentration of Tavoy people who often brought water buffaloes to market for trade. It became Ban Thawai District during King Chulalongkorn's rule, and was part of Phra Pradaeng province. When that province was abolished in 1932, its northern parts were added to Phra Nakhon (Bangkok) Province. Ban Tavoy was then renamed Yan Nawa District in agreement with the earlier rename of Wat Ban Thawai to Wat Yan Nawa. It became a khet in 1972 and the present-day khwaeng in 1975. On 9 November 1989 parts of Yan Nawa were split off to form two new districts, Sathon and Bang Kho Laem. Wat Yan Nawa, the temple the district name inherits, is now in Sathon district.

Administration
The district is divided into two sub-districts (khwaeng).

Places
 Rama IX Bridge, the first cable-stayed bridge in Thailand.
 Bhumibol Bridge
 Wat Chong Nonsi
 Wat Pho Maen Khunaram

Shopping
 Central Plaza Rama III
 Chatuchak Rama III
 Lotus Rama III

Diplomatic mission
 Embassy of Libya

Education

References

External links

 BMA website with tourist landmarks of Yan Nawa
 Yan Nawa District Office (Thai only)

 
Districts of Bangkok